The President of the National Council of Switzerland presides over the National Council and Federal Assembly. The National Council President is often colloquially referred to as the "highest Swiss person", as the highest ranking person subject to the people's vote. However, this is an honorary title and the president is not the head of state; the head of state is the entire Federal Council. In the official order of precedence, she or he ranks behind the members of the Federal Council, but ahead of the President of the Swiss Council of States.

The President of the National Council also chairs the United Federal Assembly which meets to set elections, decides conflicts of jurisdiction between federal authorities and issues pardons. The officeholder is elected by the National Council for a term of one year without the possibility and may not be elected for a second consecutive term, but may be elected to the post in the future.

List of presidents of the National Council

² resigned per 1 March 2005

Statistics by canton
These counts by canton do not take in account the varying number of members of the National Council per canton (in 2005: 1-34 members).

See also
National Council (Switzerland)
Presidents of the Council of States
Presidents of the Confederation
Members of the Swiss National Council

References

External links
The presidents (speakers) of the National Council and the Council of States
Presidents of the National Council since 1848
Dictionnaire historique de la Suisse (DHS)

National Council Presidents
Presidents
Switzerland, National Council, Presidents